is a Japanese voice actor and narrator who is affiliated with 81 Produce.

Biography
Miyake dreamed of becoming a voice actor in hopes of meeting an actress that he admired and wanted to co-star with. After graduating from the Amusement Media Research Institute, he joined the talent agency 81 Produce. He became the replacement voice actor, after Masashi Amenomori, Shigezō Sasaoka, Hirotaka Suzuoki, Daisuke Gōri, Nobuyuki Furuta, Unshō Ishizuka, Yuu Shimaka and Kiyoyuki Yanada. In addition, Miyake voiced Elephantus in Yatterman Night dedicated to Kazuya Tatekabe. Miyake won the Best Actor in a Supporting Role award at the 13th Seiyu Awards.

Filmography

Animation

Films

Drama CD

Live action

Video games

Dubbing roles

Live action Japanese dubbing

Animation Japanese dubbing

References

External links
 81 Produce profile 
  
 
 Kenta Miyake at Ryu's Seiyuu Infos
 
 

1977 births
Living people
Japanese male video game actors
Japanese male voice actors
Male voice actors from Okinawa Prefecture
Seiyu Award winners
81 Produce voice actors
20th-century Japanese male actors
21st-century Japanese male actors